Soniachne is a rural settlement (a selyshche) in the Zaporizhzhia Raion (district) of Zaporizhzhia Oblast in southern Ukraine. Its population was 588 in the 2001 Ukrainian Census. Soniachne is the administrative center of the Soniachne Rural Council, a local government area.

References

Zaporizhzhia Raion
Rural settlements in Zaporizhzhia Oblast
Populated places established in 1991
1991 establishments in Ukraine